James or Jim Calder may refer to:

Politicians
James Alexander Calder (1868–1956), Canadian politician
James Erskine Calder (1808–1882), English-born Surveyor General of Tasmania

Sportsmen
Jim Calder (footballer) (born 1960), Scottish footballer
Jim Calder (rugby union) (born 1957), Scottish international
Jim Calder (rugby league) (fl. 1930s), New Zealand international

Others
James Calder (academic administrator) (1826–1893), fifth president of Pennsylvania State University, USA
James Traill Calder (1794–1864), Scottish local historian
Sir James Calder, 1st Baronet (1686–1711), of the Calder baronets
Sir James Calder, 3rd Baronet (1760–1774), of the Calder baronets
James Calder (orthopaedic surgeon) (born 1968), English orthopaedic surgeon

See also
Calder (surname)